This is a list of Korean photographers.

A 
 Jun Ahn

B 
 Bae Bien-u (1950-)
Chan-Hyo Bae (1975-)
Bae Doona (1979-)

J 
 Ina Jang (1982-)

K 
 Atta Kim (1956-)
Kim Jung-man (1954-)
Miru Kim (1981-)

L 
 Jungjin Lee (1961-)
Nikki S. Lee (1970-)

P 

 Park Jung-geun (1988-)
 Park Nohae (1957-)
 Soi Park

Y 

 Yoo Byung-eun (1941-2014)

Photography in Korea
Lists of photographers by nationality
Photographers